Alıçlı (literally "(place) with hawthorns") is a Turkish place name that may refer to the following places in Turkey:

 Alıçlı, Besni, a village in the district of Besni, Adıyaman Province
 Alıçlı, Kozluk, a village in the district of Kozluk, Batman Province
 Alıçlı, Ulus, a village in the district of Ulus, Bartın Province
 Alıçlık, Bayburt, a village in the district of Bayburt, Bayburt Province

See also
 Alıç (disambiguation)